Lungești is a commune located in Vâlcea County, Oltenia, Romania. It is composed of six villages: Carcadiești, Dumbrava, Fumureni, Gănţulei, Lungești and Stănești-Lunca.

References

Communes in Vâlcea County
Localities in Oltenia